Philippus Jacobus Wilhelmus Buys (born 1 March 1963) is a South African trade union leader.

Born in Delareyville, Buys studied at Potchefstroom University and then the University of Johannesburg.  He began working as an industrial relations officer at Eskom, then in 1992 moved to work as an organiser for the Mine Workers' Union (MWU).  In 1994, he served on the Volkstaat Council, which investigated the potential of an Afrikaner Volkstaat.

In 1997, he became CEO of the MWU.  At the time, the union was associated with white nationalism and its membership had fallen to 30,000.  Under Buys' leadership, the union was renamed as Solidarity, its membership greatly increasing.  Buys also founded AfriForum, which lobbies for the interests of Afrikaners.

References

1963 births
Living people
People from North West (South African province)
South African trade union leaders
University of Johannesburg alumni